War of the Worlds, Pt. 1 is the second solo album by Symphony X guitarist Michael Romeo, released on 27 July 2018. It is his first solo album in over two decades (since 1994's The Dark Chapter) and his first release since 2015's Underworld with Symphony X.

The album is inspired by the homonymous novel by H. G. Wells and incorporates elements of EDM, dubstep and classical music, inspired by movie score composers such as Bernard Herrmann and John Williams. Most of it was created when Symphony X's vocalist Russell Allen was still recovering from the road accident he suffered one year before while on tour with Adrenaline Mob (in which his bandmate David Zablidowsky and tour manager Jane Train died) and the other members were involved with other projects. Michael hired three musicians he's known for a while, including bassist John DeServio, with whom he went to high school.

Two lyric videos, one for "Djinn" and another for "Fear the Unknown", were released on 29 June and 18 July, respectively. According to Romeo, a sequel, War of the Worlds, Pt. 2, is already at the final stages of recording, but will take a while to be released because he wants people "to absorb the first one for a while, and then we'll put out the second record. They'll complement each other, but they'll also be a bit different". It was released on March 25, 2022.

Track listing

Personnel
 Rick Castellano – vocals
 Michael Romeo – guitars, keyboards, orchestrations
 John DeServio – bass guitar
 John Macaluso – drums

Charts

References

2018 albums
Michael Romeo albums